Arcangelo Pinelli (born 20 March 1944) is a retired Italian fencer. He competed at the 1964, 1968 and 1972 Summer Olympics in the individual and team foil events with the best result of seventh place with the Italian teams in 1964 and 1968.

References

1944 births
Living people
Italian male fencers
Olympic fencers of Italy
Fencers at the 1964 Summer Olympics
Fencers at the 1968 Summer Olympics
Fencers at the 1972 Summer Olympics
Universiade medalists in fencing
People from Caltanissetta
Universiade gold medalists for Italy
Medalists at the 1967 Summer Universiade
Sportspeople from the Province of Caltanissetta